The 2017 Central Michigan Chippewas football team represented Central Michigan University in the 2017 NCAA Division I FBS football season. They were led by third-year head coach John Bonamego and played their home games at Kelly/Shorts Stadium as members of the West Division of the Mid-American Conference. They finished the season 8–5, 6–2 in MAC play to finish in a tie for second place in the West Division. They received an invitation to the Famous Idaho Potato Bowl where they lost to Wyoming.

Previous season 
The Chippewas finished the 2016 season 6–7, 3–5 to finish in fifth place in the MAC West. They received an invitation to the Miami Beach Bowl where they were blown out by Tulsa 55–10.

Preseason 
Central Michigan was picked to finish in fifth place in the MAC West Division in a preseason poll of league media.

Schedule

Game summaries

Rhode Island

at Kansas

at Syracuse

Miami (OH)

at Boston College

at Ohio

Toledo

at Ball State

at Western Michigan

In an increasingly heavy downpour in Kalamazoo, the Chips avenged their 49-10 loss to the Broncos the year before. During the battle between the two bitter in-state rivals, the Chippewas fell behind 28-14 in the 3rd quarter. The Chips then staged a dramatic comeback in the 4th quarter, scoring 21 unanswered points, capped off by Shane Morris’ 77 yard touchdown pass to Corey Willis with 2:37 left in the game to defeat the Broncos for the first time since 2013 by a score of 35-28.

Eastern Michigan

at Kent State

Northern Illinois

vs. Wyoming–Famous Idaho Potato Bowl

References

Central Michigan
Central Michigan Chippewas football seasons
Central Michigan Chippewas football